Samford is a town in Moreton Bay Region, South East Queensland, Australia. It consists of two localities, Samford Village and Samford Valley.

Geography 
Access to Samford from Brisbane is via Samford Road through the Samford State Forest and takes about 10 minutes from Ferny Grove.

Samford is located adjacent to the Samford State Forest section of Brisbane Forest Park. Brisbane Forest Park comprises more than 26,500 ha enclosing 16 separate recreation areas. The wide variety of habitat provides a sanctuary for a broad range of native wildlife.  Samford Valley is known as the "Home of the Powerful Owl", as the area is known to be an important breeding area for the bird, Australia's largest owl.  Parts of D'Aguilar Range, which includes nearby Camp Mountain, Mount Nebo, Mount Glorious and Mount Pleasant, give rise to the valley in which Samford lies.

History
Samford was occupied by the indigenous people who named it Kupidabin, an Aboriginal word from the Waka language, meaning 'place of possums'. They named D.L. Brown's land in Samford, Karandukamari. Samford was an important location for "kippa-ring" or initiation ceremony. Tribes from Ipswich, Cressbrook, Mount Brisbane and Brisbane would travel here to have their "kippas" (young men) initiated.

Samford's very first inhabitants were an aboriginal tribe which belonged to the Waka language group, whose territory also included the upper Brisbane River and the South Burnett. While there are no aboriginal tribes still living in Samford, their history remains by means of the Bora Ring at Wights Mountain, the burial site near Upper Camp Mountain Road and the records kept at the local historical museum.

Although Samford is closer to Brisbane than most acreage areas in the Moreton Bay Regional Council, the secluded valleys of the upper reaches of the South Pine River were not settled by Europeans until the mid-1850s. The first land auctions were held on 1 February 1855.

Samford Provisional School opened on 1 October 1872. In 1879, it became Samford State School.

In 1916 the Highlands Estate was advertised for private sale by Robinson & Jolly. A map of the estate indicates the land was five minutes from the Samford railway station on the Enoggera Terror's Creek Line (the Dayboro railway line), which was under construction at the time.

Buildings began to appear in Samford Village's Main Street in 1916. The first business to open in the Samford area was a shop and bakehouse which was owned and built by Alex Lawson.

The Samford railway station on the Dayboro line opened 1 July 1918; it reached its terminus at Dayboro railway station on 25 September 1920.

In 1919, the O'Hara's Hotel (the Samford Hotel) shifted to its current location. The location from which the hotel previously operated was purchased and used by the CSIRO. In the late 1950s, this hotel again changed its name from the Samford Railway Hotel to the Golden Valley Hotel.

By 1908, banana growing on the steep ridges at the foot of the ranges had become one of the most important industries in the Samford district. After World War 1, the government created additional small farms so that returned servicemen with limited capital were able to get started in the industry. During 1926 and 1927, more bananas were consigned to southern markets from Samford Railway Station than any other railway station in Queensland. However this success was short-lived. The banana bunchy top virus which had wiped out banana growing in the Northern Rivers region of New South Wales, spread to Samford and was the primary reason for the decline of the industry in the Pine Rivers Shire.

After the subdivision of farms into acreage homesites commenced in the 1960s, with substantial upgrading of road access completed more recently, many of Samford's residents commute to work in Brisbane.

In 2008, Samford became part of the Moreton Bay Region.

Facilities
 
Samford Village contains a mix of historical buildings, restaurants, shops and services. Samford's heritage as a village servicing farming communities is apparent from the facilities which include an equipment hire business, hardware and produce stores, as well as banking, shopping, medical, chiropractic, fitness, legal and accounting.

A tourist attraction is the Samford Valley Historical Museum. Located in the heart of the village, John Scott Park is the frequent venue of community cultural activities such as free concerts and holiday celebrations. The park contains playground facilities for children and is a popular venue for weekend barbecues. The Slab Hut Gallery is an information centre and art gallery located in John Scott Park at the centre of town. There are several gift shops, restaurants and cafes, as well as a pub, in the immediate vicinity of John Scott Park.

In addition to the Samford Scout Group, the Scout Association of Queensland operates Baden Powell Park. An easy walk from the Village, Baden Powell Park consists of 56 hectares of natural bush land bordering the Brisbane Forest Park. Within the grounds are modern, fully equipped conference facilities for up to 150 people, a commercial kitchen, accommodation blocks, camping ground, swimming pool, dam, abseiling tower as well as walking trails of various grades. Baden Powell Park is the venue for a number of activities open to the public such as laser skirmish and abseiling.

The Baden-Powell Heritage Centre & Museum is open to scouting groups and to the general public on weekends.

The Moreton Bay Regional Council operates a mobile library service which visits John Scott Park on Station Street.

The Samford branch of the Queensland Country Women's Association meets at the QCWA Hall at 31 Main Street, Samford Village.

Sports and activities 
Some of the local sports played in and around town include swimming, horse riding, soccer, football, cricket, netball, tennis, archery and lawn bowls. The Pine Rivers Shire Council, now known as the Moreton Bay Regional Council, acquired the former CSIRO land which is on the northern edge of the Village and comprises some 140 ha. The Council is planning a sport and recreation facility that will become a major resource for the residents of Samford Valley and the Moreton Bay region. The possible facilities include open space, camp ground, equestrian, tennis, netball, amphitheatre, kiosk, soccer and rugby league and parking.

The area is very popular with cyclists and the area saw an explosion of local coffee shops between 2010 and 2015.

Community 

The Samford Support Network is a group of volunteers providing a variety of services to community members who are ill, elderly, living with a disability, or struggling.

Education 
Samford State School is a government primary (Prep-6) school for boys and girls at School Road. In 2018, the school had an enrolment of 850 students with 61 teachers (52 full-time equivalent) and 37 non-teaching staff (23 full-time equivalent). It includes a special education program.

There is no secondary school in Samford. The nearest  government secondary school is Ferny Grove State High school in Ferny Grove to the south-east.

Several private schools maintain buses to Samford, including St Paul's School, Bald Hills, Padua College and St. Joseph's Nudgee College at Boondall.

Climate
Samford has a sub-tropical climate with very hot, humid summers and mild, dry, sunny winters. Most rain falls during the height of summer, between November and February. Whilst summer maximum average temperatures generally linger around 30C, the summer months have some extremely hot days, sometimes higher than 40C.

References

Further reading

External links 

 
 

Towns in Queensland
Moreton Bay Region
Populated places established in 1855
1855 establishments in Australia